The National Poetry Award is an honor presented by Colombia's Ministry of Culture. It rewards excellence in poetic production by a Colombian citizen, living in the country or abroad, for a Spanish-language work published in the preceding two years. It includes a monetary prize of 60 million Colombian pesos ( United States dollars).

Prior to 1997, it was presented by the Colombian Institute of Culture.

List of winners

References

Colombian awards
Ministry of Culture (Colombia)
Poetry awards